Eddie Jones (March 1, 1929, Greenwood, Mississippi – May 31, 1997, West Hartford, Connecticut) was an American jazz double bassist.

Jones grew up in Red Bank, New Jersey, and played early in the 1950s with Sarah Vaughan and Lester Young. Jones taught music in South Carolina from 1951 to 1952, and became a member of Count Basie's orchestra in 1953, remaining there until 1962. He recorded frequently with this ensemble, and also played with Basie in smaller ensembles; these featured both Basie sidemen (Joe Newman, Frank Foster, Frank Wess, Thad Jones, Ernie Wilkins) and others (Milt Jackson, Coleman Hawkins, Putte Wickman). Jones quit music in 1962 and took a job with IBM; he later became vice president of an insurance company. In the 1980s he returned to jazz and played on and off in swing jazz ensembles.

Discography
With Dorothy Ashby
The Jazz Harpist (Regent, 1957)
With Count Basie
Dance Session (Clef, 1953)
Dance Session Album #2 (Clef, 1954)
Basie (Clef, 1954)
Count Basie Swings, Joe Williams Sings (Clef, 1955) with Joe Williams
April in Paris (Verve, 1956)
The Greatest!! Count Basie Plays, Joe Williams Sings Standards with Joe Williams
Metronome All-Stars 1956 (Clef, 1956) with Ella Fitzgerald and Joe Williams
Hall of Fame (Verve, 1956 [1959])
Basie in London (Verve, 1956)
One O'Clock Jump (Verve, 1957) with Joe Williams and Ella Fitzgerald
Count Basie at Newport (Verve, 1957)
The Atomic Mr. Basie (Roulette, 1957) aka Basie and E=MC2
Basie Plays Hefti (Roulette, 1958)
Sing Along with Basie (Roulette, 1958) with Joe Williams and Lambert, Hendricks & Ross 
Basie One More Time (Roulette, 1959)
Everyday I Have the Blues (Roulette, 1959) with Joe Williams
Dance Along with Basie (Roulette, 1959)
Not Now, I'll Tell You When (Roulette, 1960)
The Count Basie Story (Roulette, 1960)
Kansas City Suite (Roulette, 1960)
The Legend (Roulette, 1961)
Back with Basie (Roulette, 1962)
With Bob Brookmeyer
Jazz Is a Kick (Mercury, 1960)
With Kenny Clarke
Telefunken Blues (Savoy, 1955)
With Jimmy Cleveland
Cleveland Style (EmArcy, 1958)
With Frank Foster
No 'Count (Savoy, 1956)
With Al Grey 
The Last of the Big Plungers (Argo, 1959)
The Thinking Man’s Trombone (Argo, 1960)
With Coleman Hawkins
The Saxophone Section (World Wide, 1958)
With Milt Jackson
Meet Milt Jackson (Savoy, 1955)
Opus de Jazz (Savoy, 1955)
Bean Bags with Coleman Hawkins (Atlantic, 1958)
With Hank Jones
Quartet-Quintet (Savoy, 1955)
Bluebird (Savoy, 1955)
With Thad Jones
The Jones Boys (Period, 1957) with Jimmy Jones, Quincy Jones and Jo Jones
With The Jones Brothers: Thad Jones, Hank Jones, Elvin Jones
Keepin' Up with the Joneses (MetroJazz, 1958)
With Joe Newman
The Count's Men (Jazztone, 1955)
I'm Still Swinging (RCA Victor, 1955)
Salute to Satch (RCA Victor, 1956)
I Feel Like a Newman (Storyville, 1956)
The Midgets (Vik, 1956)
The Happy Cats (Coral, 1957)
Soft Swingin' Jazz (Coral, 1958) with Shirley Scott
Joe Newman with Woodwinds (Roulette, 1958)
Counting Five in Sweden (Metronome, 1958)
Jive at Five (Swingville, 1960)
Good 'n' Groovy (Swingville, 1961)
With Paul Quinichette
Basie Reunion (Prestige, 1958)
With Zoot Sims
Stretching Out (United Artists, 1959)
With Buddy Tate
Unbroken (MPS, 1970)
With Eddie "Cleanhead" Vinson
Clean Head's Back in Town (Bethlehem, 1957)
With Frank Wess
 North, South, East....Wess (Savoy 1956)
Opus in Swing (Savoy, 1956)
Opus de Blues (Savoy, 1959 [1984])
The Frank Wess Quartet (Prestige, 1960)
With Ernie Wilkins
Flutes & Reeds (Savoy, 1955) with Frank Wess
With Lem Winchester
Another Opus (New Jazz, 1960)

References
Scott Yanow, [ Eddie Jones] at Allmusic

1929 births
1997 deaths
American jazz double-bassists
Male double-bassists
20th-century American musicians
Jazz musicians from Mississippi
20th-century double-bassists
20th-century American male musicians
American male jazz musicians
Curfew (band) members